Murolimzhon Murodiljonovich Akhmedov otherwise Murolimjon or Murolim Ahmedov (born 5 January 1992 in Uch-Korgon, Batken Province, Kyrgyzstan) is an international professional football player for the Kyrgyzstan national football team and currently playing for bangladesh premier league team Bangladesh Police FC, as a midfielder.

Career

Club
On 5 February 2019, Dordoi Bishkek announced that Akhmedov had signed a new one-year contract with the club, after scoring 13 goals in 28 Kyrgyzstan League matches during 2018.

On 24 November 2019, Dordoi Bishkek announced the departure of Akhmedov.

Career statistics

International

Statistics accurate as of match played 14 November 2017

Honors
Alay Osh
 Kyrgyzstan League (3): 2015, 2016, 2017
The Best player in Kyrgyzstan [2017]

References

Kyrgyzstani footballers
1992 births
Living people
Kyrgyzstani people of Tajik descent
Kyrgyzstan international footballers
People from Batken Region
Association football midfielders
2019 AFC Asian Cup players
Footballers at the 2014 Asian Games
Asian Games competitors for Kyrgyzstan